The Orange Park Negro Elementary School (also known as the Teresa Miller School or Neighborhood Service Center) is a historic school in Orange Park, Florida. It is located at 440 McIntosh Avenue. On July 15, 1998, it was added to the U.S. National Register of Historic Places.

References

External links

 Clay County listings at National Register of Historic Places
 Neighborhood Service Center at Florida's Office of Cultural and Historical Programs

National Register of Historic Places in Clay County, Florida
Public elementary schools in Florida
African-American history of Florida